Vasudeva III was possibly the son of Vasudeva II and a ruler of the Kushan Empire c. 360-365 CE.

Reign
By the reign of Vasudeva III, the Kushan Empire had declined into insignificance. In the west the Sasanian Empire was a threat, and in the east local native people had regained their independence.

Disputed existence
Existence of Vasudeva III has been disputed, as has been the existence of his supposed father Vasudeva II. No epigraphic evidence supports his existence.

It has also been proposed, from numismatic evidence, that there may have been another Kushan ruler with the same name and regnal number as Vasudeva III.

References 

Kushan Empire
3rd-century Indian monarchs